The Cardboard Lover is a 1928 American silent romantic comedy film directed by Robert Z. Leonard and starring Marion Davies,  Nils Asther and Jetta Goudal. It was produced by Cosmopolitan Productions and distributed by Metro Goldwyn Mayer.

The film is based on the 1926 play Dans sa candeur naive by Jacques Deval, with the genders of the main characters switched for this adaptation. In London, Tallulah Bankhead played the female lead. On Broadway, Jeanne Eagels played the female lead.

The film survives at the Library of Congress and in the Turner library. It was remade as The Passionate Plumber in 1932 and Her Cardboard Lover in 1942.

Plot
A group of American coeds/flappers arrives at the Hotel Venitien on the French Riviera. In the hotel lobby, Sally Baxter encounters Monsieur de Segurola, "the famous baritone", and asks him to write something in her autograph album. However, when she reads what he has written, she tears it out. Next, she spots handsome Andre Briault, "the famous tennis champion", and his girlfriend Simone. After Andre drives away, Sally notices Simone and de Sugorola making eye contact. (Albine, Andre's valet, does not approve of Simone either.)

When Andre later telephones Simone, he hears someone singing; Simone claims it is only a phonograph record playing, but then de Sugorola coughs. Andre heads over to the hotel to check up on her. She tries to distract him, but Andre spots de Sugorola trying to sneak out of her suite, tosses him out into the hall and breaks up with Simone.

The last part is witnessed by Sally. She chases after Andre to get his autograph, but her pen seems to be out of ink. After he leaves, she finds that there is ink after all; unable to get a taxi, she steals a car and follows him to the casino. There, she inadvertently loses 50,000 francs playing baccarat against him, and is asked to pay. She writes on a check that she has no money to speak of, and Andre good-naturedly tears it up.

Then Andre spots Simone. He is still in love with her, so Sally suggests he pretend to be in love with someone else. He thinks that is an excellent plan; he chooses Sally, telling her that this is how she can pay her gambling debt. He instructs Sally to never let him be alone with Simone and to not let him weaken. When Simone tries to win him back, he introduces her to his "fiancée", Sally.

However, he keeps falling for Simone's enticements. But Sally is extremely persistent, going to outlandish lengths to keep him out of her rival's clutches. Finally, she socks him in the jaw to stop him from chasing after Simone. He reacts by pushing her clear into the next room, knocking her unconscious. This finally makes him realize whom he truly loves.

Cast
Marion Davies as Sally
Jetta Goudal as Simone
Nils Asther as Andre
De Segurola as De Segurola
Tenen Holtz as Albine
Pepi Lederer as Peppy
Carrie Daumery as Chaperon (uncredited)

Production
Based on a Broadway play, the story was totally revamped by inserting the character of Sally Baxter into the play's love story between Andre and Simone. Purportedly, Davies' impersonation had audiences refusing to believe it was really Davies. The production also featured Davies' niece Pepi Lederer in a small role as a tourist. Davies recalled that Goudal was a real pill and would only speak French on the set. This was another solid box-office hit for Davies.

References

External links

Backlots blog: The Cardboard Lover (1928)--A Rare Treasure

1928 films
American black-and-white films
American romantic comedy films
American films based on plays
Films based on works by Jacques Deval
Films directed by Robert Z. Leonard
Films set on the French Riviera
Metro-Goldwyn-Mayer films
American silent feature films
1928 romantic comedy films
Surviving American silent films
Flappers
1920s American films
Silent romantic comedy films
Silent American comedy films